Elections to Daventry District Council were held on 1 May 2003. One third of the council was up for election and the Conservative Party stayed in overall control of the council. Overall turnout was 34%.

After the election, the composition of the council was:
Conservative 33
Labour 4

Election result

Ward results

References
2003 Daventry election result
Ward results

2003 English local elections
2003
2000s in Northamptonshire